Breakfast Republic was the Irish national broadcaster RTÉ 2fm's breakfast radio show. It was presented by Keith Walsh and comedians Jennifer Zamparelli and Bernard O'Shea, from 6–10am weekdays. It first aired on 17 February 2014. Regular features include Jen's Bits, where Zamparelli offers dry or caustic views on members of the celebrity world, and Smarty Pants, where Bernard regularly pretends to be less intelligent than he actually is.

O'Shea and Zamparelli have wide experience in television, notably as part of the similarly toned "Republic of Telly". 2015 polls indicate the show's popularity with a rise in listenership of 10,000, bringing the average to 109,000.

References

Irish breakfast radio shows
RTÉ 2fm programmes
2014 radio programme debuts